Oestroidea is a superfamily of Calyptratae including the blow flies, bot flies, flesh flies, and their relatives. It occurs worldwide and has about 15,000 described species.

The superfamily includes the families:
Calliphoridae
Mesembrinellidae (formerly included in Calliphoridae)
Mystacinobiidae
Oestridae
Polleniidae (formerly included in Calliphoridae)
Rhiniidae (formerly included in Calliphoridae)
Rhinophoridae
Sarcophagidae
Tachinidae
Ulurumyiidae

Ecology 
Oestroidea have a wide range of feeding habits and breeding environments: saprophagous (many Calliphoridae and Sarcophagidae), feeding on blood of birds or mammals (some Calliphoridae), parasites of gastropods or earthworms (some Calliphoridae), parasitoids of arthropods (Rhinophoridae, Tachinidae and some Sarcophagidae), living in association with termites or ants (some Calliphoridae and Rhiniidae), and commensals of bats (Mystacinobiidae). Various species of Calliphoridae, Oestridae and Sarcophagidae have larvae that parasitise vertebrates, causing myiasis.

Phylogeny 
Historically, Oestroidea was considered the sister group to Muscoidea. A 2012 molecular analysis placed the superfamily within a paraphyletic Muscoidea, and also confirmed the monophyly of Oestroidea and of most of its families (except Calliphoridae). Morphological and molecular analyses in 2017 yielded overall similar results. Relationships among the families and subfamilies within Oestroidea are complicated and not well resolved.

Evolution 
The earliest known fossil of Oestroidea is of a Mesembrinellidae found in Dominican amber from the Miocene. The Oestroidea in general are believed to have originated 48.2 million years ago.

Forensic entomology 
Many species of Oestroidea are of forensic importance due to feeding on decomposing animals, including humans.

References

 
Diptera superfamilies